Hyperekplexia ("exaggerated surprise") is a very rare neurologic disorder classically characterised by pronounced startle responses to tactile or acoustic stimuli and hypertonia. The hypertonia may be predominantly truncal, attenuated during sleep and less prominent after a year of age.

Classic hyperekplexia is caused by genetic mutations in a number of different genes, all of which play an important role in glycine neurotransmission. Glycine is used by the central nervous system as an inhibitory neurotransmitter. Hyperekplexia is generally classified as a genetic disease, but some disorders can mimic the exaggerated startle of hyperekplexia.

Signs and symptoms
The three main signs of hyperekplexia are generalized stiffness, excessive startle beginning at birth and nocturnal myoclonus. Affected individuals are fully conscious during episodes of stiffness, which consist of forced closure of the eyes and an extension of the extremities followed by a period of generalised stiffness and uncontrolled falling at times. Initially, the disease was classified into a "major" and a "minor" form, with the minor form being characterized by an excessive startle reflex, but lacking stiffness. There is only genetic evidence for the existence of the major form.

Other signs and symptoms of hyperekplexia may include episodic neonatal apnea, excessive movement during sleep and the head-retraction reflex. The link to some cases of Sudden Infant Death remains controversial.

Genetics
Hyperekplexia is known to be caused by a variety of genes, encoding both pre- and postsynaptic proteins. The symptoms displayed, as well as the forms of heritance, vary based on which gene is affected.

GLRA1
The first gene linked conclusively to hyperekplexia was GLRA1. The GLRA1 gene encodes the glycine receptor alpha-1 subunit, which, together with the glycine receptor beta subunit, forms synaptic glycine receptors. Inhibitory glycine receptors are ligand-gated chloride channels that facilitate fast responses in the brainstem and spinal-cord. Homomeric glycine receptors composed exclusively of alpha-1 subunits exhibit normal ion channel electrophysiology but are not sequestered at the synaptic junction. Native glycine receptors are thus supposed to be heteromers of the alpha-1 and beta subunits, in either a 3:2 or 2:3 ratio.

Within these heteromers, it is believed that the alpha-1 subunits bind glycine and undergo a conformational change, inducing a conformational change in the pentamer, causing the ion-channel to open. Although autosomal dominant inheritance was initially reported, there are at least as many cases described with autosomal recessive inheritance. Thus far, the general rule is that mutations causing structurally normal proteins that cannot bind glycine or cannot properly undergo a required conformational change will result in a dominant form of the disease, while mutations that result in truncated or wildly malformed subunits that cannot be integrated into a receptor protein will result in a recessive form.

GLRB
The GLRB gene encodes the beta subunit of the glycine receptor. Homomeric glycine receptors composed of beta subunits do not open in response to glycine stimulation, however, the beta subunit is essential for proper receptor localization through its interactions with gephyrin, which results in receptor clustering at the synaptic cleft. As such, the defects within the GLRB gene show autosomal recessive inheritance.

SLC6A5
The SLC6A5 gene encodes the GlyT2 transporter, a neuronal pre-synaptic glycine re-uptake transporter. In comparison to the GlyT1 transporter, found mostly in glial cells, GlyT2 helps maintain a high concentration of glycine within the axon terminal of glycinergic neurons. Mutations of the SLC6A5 gene have been associated with hyperekplexia in an autosomal recessive manner. Defects within this gene are hypothesized either to affect the incorporation of the transporter into the cellular membrane or to its affinity for the molecules it transports: sodium ions, chloride ions and glycine. Any of these actions would drastically reduce the pre-synaptic cell's ability to produce the high vesicular concentrations of glycine necessary for proper glycine neurotransmission. GPHN and ARHGEF9 are often included in lists of genetic causes of hyperekplexia - but in fact they produce a much more complex phenotype, very distinct from classical hyperekplexia. As such they are no longer considered to be causative genes.

GPHN
Gephyrin, an integral membrane protein believed to coordinate glycine receptors, is coded by the gene GPHN. A heterozygous mutation in this gene has been identified in a sporadic case of hyperekplexia, though experimental data is inconclusive as to whether the mutation is pathogenic. Gephyrin is essential for glycine receptor clustering at synaptic junctions through its action of binding both the glycine receptor beta subunit and internal cellular microtubule structures. Gephyrin also assists in clustering GABA receptors at synapses and molybdenum cofactor synthesis. Because of its multi-functional nature, it is not presumed to be a common genetic source of hyperekplexia.

ARHGEF9
A defect within the gene coding for collybistin (ARHGEF9) has been shown to cause hyperekplexia in concert with epilepsy. Since the ARHGEF9 gene is on the X chromosome, this gene displays X-linked recessive heritance. The collybistin protein is responsible for proper gephyrin targeting, which is crucial for the proper localization of glycine and GABA receptors. Deficiencies in collybistin function would result in an artificial lack of glycine and GABA receptors at the synaptic cleft.

Diagnosis
There are three conditions used to diagnose if an infant has hereditary hyperekplexia: if the child's body is stiff all over as soon as they are born, if they overreact to noises and other stimuli, and if the reaction to stimuli is followed by an overall stiffness where the child is unable to make any voluntary movements. A combination of electroencephalogram and an electromyogram may help diagnose this condition in patients who have not displayed symptoms as children. The electroencephalogram will not show abnormal activity other than a spike in wakefulness or alertness, while the electromyogram will show rapid muscular responses and hyperreflexia. Otherwise, genetic testing is the only definitive diagnosis. MRIs and CT scans will be normal unless other conditions exist.

Treatment
The most commonly effective treatment is clonazepam, which leads to the increased efficacy of another inhibitory neurotransmitter, GABA. There are anecdotal reports of the use of levetiracetam in genetic and acquired hyperekplexia. During attacks of hypertonia and apnea, the limbs and head may be flexed towards the trunk in order to dissipate the symptoms. This is named the Vigevano maneuver after the doctor who invented it.

History
The disorder was first described in 1958 by Kirstein and Silfverskiold, who reported a family with 'drop seizures'. In 1962 Drs. Kok and Bruyn reported an unidentified hereditary syndrome, initially started as hypertonia in infants. Genetic analysis within this large Dutch pedigree was later found to carry a mutation within the GLRA1 gene, which was the first gene implicated in hyperekplexia.

See also
 Myotonia
 Jumping Frenchmen of Maine
 Latah
 Stiff-person syndrome

References

External links 
 GeneReview/NIH/UW entry on Hyperekplexia

Neurological disorders
Reflexes
Rare diseases